Alexander Biega,  was a Canadian lawyer and author. He was the President of the Ukrainian Canadian Centennial Commission – Quebec, and author of The Ukrainian Experience in Quebec (Toronto, Basilian Press, 1994).

Background 
He was the son of Peter Biega, a Ukrainian emigrant who settled in Canada. Biega was called to the Bar of Quebec in 1949 and practiced as a criminal defence lawyer in Montreal, Quebec.

His book, The Ukrainian Experience in Quebec (co-written with Myroslaw Diakowsky), was published by Basilian Press, in both French and English, in 1994.

Biega died in September 2004 at the age of 82.

References

External links
Conversation Between Alexander Biega, QC and Levko Lukianenko His Excellency, Ambassador Of Ukraine In Canada, September 15, 1993

20th-century King's Counsel
2004 deaths
1920s births
Canadian King's Counsel